Lepismatidae is a family of primitive wingless insects with about 190 described species. This family contains the two most familiar members of the order Zygentoma: the silverfish (Lepisma saccharinum) and the firebrat (Thermobia domestica). It is one of five families in the order Zygentoma.

Lepismatids are elongated, flattened insects, the majority of which are scavengers. The abdomen is usually clothed in tiny scales and terminates with three "tails" of roughly equal length. The compound eyes are small and well separated.

They typically live in warm, damp environments, including indoors. They avoid light.

Parasites
Member of the Strepsiptera family Mengenillinidae exclusively parasitise members of Lepismatidae. Host-species relationships include: Eoxenos laboulbenei on Tricholepisma aureum, Neoasterolepisma wasmanni and N. palmonii; Mengenilla parvula on Sceletolepisma michaelseni; Mengenilla nigritula on Ctenolepisma ciliatum and Ctenolepisma sp.; Mengenilla laevigata, M. quasita, M. spinulosa and M. subnigrescens on C. lineatum; and an unidentified species of Strepsiptera on Mormisma peyerimhoffi.

Parasitic Apicomplexa are often found in the intestinal tract, especially the crop, of Lepismatidae. Ctenolepisma lineatum contains on average 15 parasite specimens per animal. Several species of gregarine parasites have been recorded from the intestinal tract of the gray silverfish:

Genera
These genera belong to the family Lepismatidae:

 Acrotelsa Escherich, 1905
 Acrotelsella Silvestri, 1935
 Afrolepisma Mendes, 1981
 Allacrotelsa Silvestri, 1935
 Anallacrotelsa Mendes, 1996
 Anisolepisma Paclt, 1967
 Apteryskenoma Paclt, 1952
 Asiolepisma Kaplin, 1989
 Ctenolepisma Escherich, 1905
 Desertinoma Kaplin, 1992
 Gopsilepisma Irish, 1990
 Hemikulina Mendes, 2008
 Hemilepisma Paclt, 1967
 Heterolepisma Escherich
 Hyperlepisma Silvestri, 1932
 Lepisma Linnaeus, 1758
 Lepismina Gervais, 1844
 Lepitrochisma Mendes, 1988
 Leucolepisma Wall, 1954
 Mirolepisma Silvestri, 1938
 Monachina Silvestri, 1908
 Mormisma Silvestri, 1938
 Namibmormisma Irish, 1989
 Namunukulina Wygodzinsky, 1957
 Nebkhalepisma Irish, 1989
 Neoasterolepisma Mendes, 1988
 Ornatilepisma Irish, 1989
 Panlepisma Silvestri, 1940
 Primacrotelsa Mendes, 2004
 Prolepismina Silvestri, 1940
 Psammolepisma Irish, 1989
 Sabulepisma Irish, 1989
 Sceletolepisma Wygodzinsky, 1955
 Silvestrella Escherich, 1905
 Stylifera Stach, 1932
 Swalepisma Irish, 1989
 Thermobia Bergroth, 1890
 Tricholepisma Paclt, 1967
 Xenolepisma Mendes, 1981
 † Burmalepisma Mendes & Poinar, 2008 Burmese amber, Myanmar, Cenomanian
 † Cretalepisma Mendes & Wunderlich, 2013 Burmese amber, Myanmar, Cenomanian
 † Onycholepisma Pierce, 1951
 † Paracrotelsa Paclt, 1967
 † Protolepisma Mendes & Poinar, 2013 Dominican amber, Miocene

References

McGavin, George C. Insects and Spiders 2004
Fauna Europaea
Nomina Insecta Nearctica

 
Insect families
Extant Aptian first appearances